The Thomas Nichols Putnam House on Main St. in Carrington, North Dakota, United States, is an American Foursquare house with Classical Revival architecture elements that was built in 1907.  It was listed on the National Register of Historic Places in 1992.

The home was the former residence of Thomas Nichols Putnam  (1855–1931) and his wife  Clara Belle Rood Putnam (1861-1937). 
Thomas Nichols Putnam was an early settler of Carrington and the  area's pioneer lumber man. He influenced the community's development through his lumberyard business and in many other ways. He served in the North Dakota State House of Representatives from 1910 to 1912  and the North Dakota State Senate from 1914 to 1930 .

References

Houses in Foster County, North Dakota
Neoclassical architecture in North Dakota
Houses completed in 1907
Houses on the National Register of Historic Places in North Dakota
National Register of Historic Places in Foster County, North Dakota
American Foursquare architecture
1907 establishments in North Dakota